Edwin "Eddie'" John Long (born June 11, 1933) is a Canadian retired professional hockey player who played 801 games in the International Hockey League with the Fort Wayne Komets from 1952 to 1966. He was a first team all-star in the 1961–62 and 1962–63 seasons.

Playing career
In the 1957–58 season after the Komets were eliminated from the post-season by the Indianapolis Chiefs, Long made a cameo with the Louisville Rebels in the deciding game 7 of the  Turner Cup Finals against the Chiefs. Allowed to play for the Rebels as a replacement for the injured Marius Groleau, Long participated and scored a goal in the Rebels Finals defeat to the Chiefs on April 2, 1958. Long suffered the rare distinctive feat of being eliminated twice in the same post-season to the same opponent.

After the 1966 season, Long retired from professional hockey and played for four years in the Senior's Ontario league with the Kingston Aces.

In 1988, as the Fort Wayne Komets second highest point getter in franchise history, Long was re-inducted into the newly established Komet Hall of Fame. He was honored with his jersey number #16 retired.

Career statistics

Awards and honours

References

External links

1933 births
Living people
Fort Wayne Komets players
Louisville Rebels players
Ice hockey people from Ottawa
Canadian ice hockey right wingers